
This is a list of countries and territories by maritime boundaries with other countries and territories.  The list encompasses adjacent maritime nations and territories with a special focus on the boundaries or borders which distinguish them.

For purposes of this list, "maritime boundary" includes boundaries that are recognized by the United Nations Convention on the Law of the Sea, which includes boundaries of territorial waters, contiguous zones, and exclusive economic zones. However, it does not include lake or river boundaries. "Potential" maritime boundaries are included; that is, the lack of a treaty or other agreement defining the exact location of the maritime boundary does not exclude the boundary from the list.

In numbering maritime boundaries, three separate figures are included for each country and territory. The first number is the total number of distinct maritime boundaries that the country or territory shares with other countries and territories. If the country shares two or more maritime boundaries with the same country or territory and the boundaries are unconnected, the boundaries are counted separately. The second number is the total number of distinct countries or territories that the country or territory borders. In this instance, if the country or territory shares two or more maritime boundaries with the same country or territory and the boundaries are unconnected, the boundaries are only counted once. The final number is the total number of unique sovereign states that the country or territory shares a maritime boundary with.

Footnotes are provided to provide clarity regarding the status of certain countries and territories.
States with a dagger are landlocked states.

See also
 List of political and geographic borders
 List of countries and territories by land borders
 List of countries and territories by land and maritime borders
 List of maritime boundary treaties
 List of territorial disputes
 Landlocked country

Notes

Explanatory Notes

Treaty and Agreement Notes

References
 Anderson, Ewan W. (2003). International Boundaries: A Geopolitical Atlas. Routledge: New York. ;  OCLC 54061586
 Charney, Jonathan I., David A. Colson, Robert W. Smith. (2005). International Maritime Boundaries, 5 vols. Hotei Publishing: Leiden.	; ; ; ; ;  OCLC 23254092
 Jagota, S. P. (1985). Maritime Boundary. Martinis Nijhoff: Dordrecht. ; ;  OCLC 	1175640
 Prescott, John Robert Victor. (1985). The Maritime Political Boundaries of the World. London: Methuen. ;  OCLC 12582178

External links

Maritime Space: Maritime Zones and Maritime Delimitation, un.org
United States Department of State (1990). "Limits in the Sea No. 108: Maritime Boundaries of the World"
VLIZ Maritime Boundaries Geodatabase, VLIZ

Maritime
Maritime
Maritime boundary